Happy hour is the practice of offering reduced prices (usually alcoholic beverages) for a specified period of time.

Music

Albums
Happy Hour, a 1974 album by Tony Booth
Happy Hour (Humans album), 1981
Happy Hour, a 1981 album by Eumir Deodato
Happy Hour (Ted Hawkins album), 1985
Happy Hour (King Missile album), 1992
Happy Hour (Youth Brigade album), 1994
Happy Hour (N-Trance album), 1998
Happy Hour (Shonen Knife album), 1998
Happy Hour (Bob & Tom album), 2005
Happy Hour (Tommy Emmanuel album), 2006
Happy Hour (Uncle Kracker album), 2009
Happy Hour!, a 2010 Japan-only compilation album by The Offspring

Songs
"Happy Hour" (The Housemartins song), 1986
"Happy Hour", a 2009 song by Cheryl Cole from 3 Words
"Happy Hour" (Weezer song), 2017

Other
Happy Hour (comic strip), a comic created in 2004 by Jim Kohl
"Happy Hour" (The Office), an episode of the American comedy series The Office
Happy Hour (TV series), a sitcom on American TV
Al Murray's Happy Hour, a chat show on British TV
Happy Hour, a film by Costa Dillon
Happy Hour (1995 film), a movie starring Jordan Chan
Happy Hour (2003 film), a film directed and co-written by Mike Bencivenga
Happy Hour (2015 film), a drama film directed by Ryusuke Hamaguchi
Happy Hour (1999 TV series), show hosted by Ahmet and Dweezil Zappa